Saroleh (also Romanized as Sarelah; also known as Sarileh, Sarleh, Sarolan) is a village in Saroleh Rural District, Meydavud District, Bagh-e Malek County, Khuzestan Province, Iran. At the 2006 census, its population was 1,027, in 221 families.

References 

Populated places in Bagh-e Malek County